Enying is a town in Fejér county, Hungary. The Olympian Géza Mészöly was born here.

Twin towns – sister cities

Enying is twinned with:
 Bad Urach, Germany
 Huedin, Romania
 Świerklany, Poland
 Yukamenskoye, Russia

References

External links

  in Hungarian

Populated places in Fejér County